Walter Supper (8 April 1887 – 3 March 1943) was a German screenwriter. Supper worked on more than thirty screenplays during his career, and also worked occasionally as an actor and director.

Supper refused to divorce his Jewish wife under Nazi pressure, which effectively ended his career. He eventually committed suicide with his wife when it became clear she was about to be arrested.

Selected filmography
 Wandering Souls (1921)
 Island of the Dead (1921)
 Mother and Child (1924)
 Chamber Music (1925)
 The Adventures of Sybil Brent (1925)
 The Flames Lie (1926)
 Roses from the South (1926)
 The Long Intermission (1927)
 My Aunt, Your Aunt (1927)
 Lotte (1928)
 Love in the Cowshed (1928)
 Violantha (1928)
 The Fourth from the Right (1929)
 The Night Belongs to Us (1929)
 Hans in Every Street (1930)
 Fire in the Opera House (1930)
 This One or None (1932)
 Love at First Sight (1932)
 Ripening Youth (1933)
 Count Woronzeff (1934)
 Trouble with Jolanthe (1934)
 Make Me Happy (1935)
 The Gypsy Baron (1935)
 Black Roses (1935)
 City of Anatol (1936)
 Ride to Freedom (1937)
 Wells in Flames (1937)

References

Bibliography 
 Hardt, Urusula. From Caligari to California: Erich Pommer's Life in the International Film Wars.  Berghahn Books, 1996.

External links 
 

1887 births
1943 deaths
German male film actors
German male screenwriters
German male writers
People from Hamm
Film people from North Rhine-Westphalia
20th-century German screenwriters
1943 suicides
Suicides by Jews during the Holocaust
German people who died in the Holocaust
Suicides in Germany